Kiljava is a village in the municipality of Nurmijärvi and Hyvinkää in southern Finland. It is located between villages of Rajamäki and Röykkä. Kiljava is most famous for its public, all-purpose educational institute (Kiljavan opisto in Finnish). It is also a popular vacation resort, with two private camping areas - one for SAFA architects and one for the Finnish Police Force - and a public beach on the shore of Lake Sääksi.

See also
 Herunen

External links
 Kiljava educational institute

Villages in Finland
Nurmijärvi